Bathygobius is a circumtropical genus of fish in the family Gobiidae.

Species
There are currently 29 recognized species in this genus:
 Bathygobius aeolosoma (J. D. Ogilby, 1889)
 Bathygobius albopunctatus (Valenciennes, 1837) (Whitespotted goby)
 Bathygobius andrei (Sauvage, 1880)
 Bathygobius antilliensis Tornabene, C. C. Baldwin & Pezold, 2010 (Antilles frillfin)
 Bathygobius arundelii (Garman, 1899)
 Bathygobius burtoni (O'Shaughnessy, 1875)
 Bathygobius casamancus (Rochebrune, 1880)
 Bathygobius coalitus (E. T. Bennett, 1832) (Whitespotted frillgoby)
 Bathygobius cocosensis (Bleeker, 1854) (Cocos frill-goby)
 Bathygobius cotticeps (Steindachner, 1879) (Cheekscaled frill-goby)
 Bathygobius curacao (Metzelaar, 1919) (Notchtongue goby)
 Bathygobius cyclopterus (Valenciennes, 1837) (Spotted frillgoby)
 Bathygobius fishelsoni Goren, 1978
 Bathygobius fuscus (Rüppell, 1830) (Dusky frillgoby)
 Bathygobius geminatus Tornabene, C. C. Baldwin & Pezold, 2010 (Twin-spotted frillfin)
 Bathygobius hongkongensis C. Lam, 1986
 Bathygobius karachiensis Hoda & Goren, 1990
 Bathygobius kreftii (Steindachner, 1866) (Krefft's frillgoby)
 Bathygobius laddi (Fowler, 1931) (Brownboy goby)
 Bathygobius lineatus (Jenyns, 1841) (Southern frillfin)
 Bathygobius meggitti (Hora & Mukerji, 1936) (Meggitt's goby)
 Bathygobius mystacium Ginsburg, 1947 (Island frillfin)
 Bathygobius niger (J. L. B. Smith, 1960) (Black minigoby)
 Bathygobius ostreicola (B. L. Chaudhuri, 1916)
 Bathygobius panayensis (D. S. Jordan & Seale, 1907)
 Bathygobius petrophilus (Bleeker, 1853)
 Bathygobius ramosus Ginsburg, 1947 (Panamic frillfin)
 Bathygobius smithi R. Fricke, 1999
 Bathygobius soporator (Valenciennes, 1837) (Frillfin goby)

References

 
Taxonomy articles created by Polbot